Scott Laurence Rauch (born September 22, 1960) is the President, Psychiatrist in Chief, and Rose Marie and Eijk van Otterloo Chair of Psychiatry of McLean Hospital,  who is known for his work using brain imaging methods to study psychiatric dysfunction.  He is a professor of psychiatry at Harvard Medical School.

He was associate chief of psychiatry for neuroscience research at Massachusetts General Hospital, where he was the founding director of the Psychiatric Neuroimaging Research Program and the MGH Division of Psychiatric Neuroscience Research and Neurotherapeutics.

Education
1982 BA in Neuroscience, Amherst College
1987 MD, University of Cincinnati College of Medicine

Publications

Books
Miguel EC, Rauch SL, Leckman JF, eds. Neuropsychiatry of the basal ganglia. Psychiatric Clinics of North America. Philadelphia: W.B. Saunders, 1997.
Dougherty DD, Rauch SL, eds. Psychiatric neuroimaging research: contemporary strategies. Washington, DC: American Psychiatric Publishing, Inc., 2001.
Dougherty DD, Rauch SL, Rosenbaum JF, eds. Essentials of neuroimaging for clinical practice. Washington, DC: American Psychiatric Publishing, Inc., 2004.
Zald DH, Rauch SL, eds. The orbitofrontal cortex. Oxford: Oxford University Press, 2006.
Stern TA, Rosenbaum JF, Fava M, Biederman J, Rauch SL, eds. Comprehensive clinical psychiatry. Philadelphia: Mosby-Elsevier, 2008.
Camprodon J, Rauch SL, Greenberg BD, Dougherty DD, eds. Psychiatric neurotherapeutics: contemporary surgical and device-based treatments. New York: Humana Press, 2015.

References

External links
Scott Rauch - Google Scholar Citations

Living people
1960 births
McLean Hospital physicians
Harvard Medical School faculty
American psychiatrists
Amherst College alumni
University of Cincinnati College of Medicine alumni
Physicians of Massachusetts General Hospital
American male non-fiction writers
American medical writers
American hospital administrators
Members of the National Academy of Medicine